Yefim Grigoryevich Trotsenko (– 25 January 1972) was a Soviet military leader.

Biography
Born to a peasant family in the Don region of the Russian Empire on 27 March 1901, Yefim Trotsenko joined the Red Army in 1918, fought in the Russian Civil War, and joined the Russian Communist Party (b) in 1920. He subsequently graduated from the Krasnodar Commanders Courses in 1922 and the Vladikavkaz Infantry School in 1925, and the Frunze Military Academy in 1931. He was among the Soviet officers sent to assist the Second Spanish Republic during the Spanish Civil War.

Promoted to kombrig in 1938 and to komdiv in 1939, Trotsenko was made chief of staff to the 1st Separate Red Banner Army in the Soviet Far East in July 1939 and a major-general upon the introduction of the traditional general officer ranks into the Soviet military in 1940. He served as the chief of staff of the 2nd (Blagoveschensk) Red Banner Army in June - July 1940, but in July was given the more senior post of chief of staff for Lieutenant-General Mikhail Kovalyov's Transbaikal Military District (reorganized as the Transbaikal Front in 1941) until July 1945. He was promoted to the rank of lieutenant-general on 1 September 1943.

With post-war changes in organization, Trotsenko was appointed chief of staff for the Transbaikal-Amur Military District in September 1945. It was reorganized into the recreated Transbaikal Military District in 1947, with Trotsenko as first deputy commander until 1952 and commander from February 1952 until December 1956.

He was made colonel-general in 1954 and appointed first deputy chief of the Department of Personnel at the Ministry of Defense of the USSR in 1956, where he remained until retiring in 1965.

He died in Moscow on 25 January 1972 and was interred at the Novodevichy Cemetery.

References

1901 births
1972 deaths
People from Rostov Oblast
Bolsheviks
Communist Party of the Soviet Union members
Members of the Supreme Soviet of the Soviet Union
Soviet colonel generals
People of the Russian Civil War
Soviet people of the Spanish Civil War
Soviet military personnel of World War II
Frunze Military Academy alumni
Burials at Novodevichy Cemetery
Recipients of the Order of Lenin
Recipients of the Order of the Red Banner